Anashua Majumdar is an Indian actress who works in Bengali-language films, TV shows and theater.

Filmography 
 Raktabeej (2023)
 Dilkhush (2023)
 Boudi Canteen (2022)
 Byadh (2022)
 Aparajito (2022)
 Gotro (2019)
 Mukherjee Dar Bou (2019)
 Maati (2018)
 Gangster (2016)
 Kagojer Nouka (2013)
 Mrs. Sen (2013) 
 Chitrangada: The Crowning Wish (2012)
 Hariye Jaai (2012)
 Bhalo Theko (2003)
 Debanjali (2000)
 Sampradan (1999)
 Kalratri (1997)
 Pashanda Pandit (1993)
 Tahader Katha (1993)
 City of Joy (1992)
 Mahaprithibi (1991)

Television

External links

References 

Living people
Actresses in Bengali cinema
Indian film actresses
Bengali theatre personalities
Bengali actresses
Loreto College, Kolkata alumni
Year of birth missing (living people)